With the outbreak of war, Great Britain and Canada planned to significantly expand the RCN.  Government and commercial vessels were pressed into naval service, vessels were transferred, loaned or purchased from the Royal Navy, and many smaller vessels were constructed in Canada. The List of Royal Canadian Navy ships of the First World War lists the surface warships, submarines and auxiliary vessels in service during the war. It includes all commissioned, non-commissioned, loaned or hired ships. and all ships crewed by RCN personnel under the command of the RCN.

Surface vessels

Cruisers





Destroyers

 (Thornycroft M class)

Naval trawlers


 (Battle class)
 (Battle class)
 (Battle class)
 (Battle class)
 (Battle class)
 (Battle class)
 (Battle class)
 (Battle class)
 (Battle class)
 (Battle class)
 (Battle class)

Naval drifters

HMCS CD 4 *(CD class)
HMCS CD 9 *
HMCS CD 10 *
HMCS CD 13 *
HMCS CD 14 *
HMCS CD 15 *
HMCS CD 16 *
HMCS CD 17 *
HMCS CD 18 *
HMCS CD 19 *
HMCS CD 20 *
 HMCS CD 21 *
HMCS CD 22 *
HMCS CD 23 *
HMCS CD 24 *
HMCS CD 25 *
HMCS CD 26 *
HMCS CD 27 *
HMCS CD 28 *
HMCS CD 29 *
CD 30 (transferred to USN)
 CD 31 (transferred to USN)
HMCS CD 32 (transferred to USN)*
HMCS CD 33 (transferred to USN)*
HMCS CD 34 (transferred to USN)*
HMCS CD 35 (transferred to USN)*
CD 36 (transferred to USN)
 HMCS CD 37 *
 HMCS CD 38 *
 HMCS CD 39 *
 HMCSCD 40 *
CD 41 (transferred to USN)
 HMCS CD 42 *
HMCS CD 46 (transferred to USN)
 HMCS CD 48 *
 HMCS CD 49 *
CD 50 (transferred to USN)
 HMCS CD 51 *
HMCS CD 53 *
CD 58 (transferred to USN)
CD 59 (transferred to USN)
CD 61 (transferred to USN)
CD 65 (transferred to USN)
CD 67 (transferred to USN)
HMCS CD 68 *
HMCS CD 73 *
HMCS CD 74 *
CD 78 (transferred to USN)
 HMCS CD 79 *
 HMCS CD 85 *
HMCS CD 87 *
CD 94 (transferred to USN)
CD 96 (transferred to USN)
CD 97 (transferred to USN)
CD 98 (transferred to USN)
CD 99 (transferred to USN)
CD 100 (transferred to USN)

*(RCN drifters according to the RN and Canadian Navy Lists. Others went to RN and USN. Secondary sources do not agree on the number and disposition of these vessels.)

Minesweepers

 HMCS P.V. I (PV type)
 HMCS P.V. II (PV type)
 HMCS P.V. III (PV type)
 HMCS P.V. IV (PV type)
 HMCS P.V. V (PV type)
 HMCS P.V. VI (PV type)
 HMCS P.V. VII (PV type)
 HMCS TR 1 ( TR series)
 HMCS TR 2 (Castle class)
 HMCS TR 3 (Castle class)
 HMCS TR 4 (Castle class)
 HMCS TR 5 (Castle class)
 HMCS TR 6 (Castle class)
 HMCS TR 7 (Castle class)
 HMCS TR 8 (Castle class)
 HMCS TR 9 (Castle class)
 HMCS TR 10 (Castle class)
 HMCS TR 11 (Castle class)
 HMCS TR 12 (Castle class)
 HMCS TR 13 (Castle class)
 HMCS TR 14 (Castle class)
 HMCS TR 15 (Castle class)
 HMCS TR 16 (Castle class)
 HMCS TR 17 (Castle class)
 HMCS TR 18 (Castle class)
 HMCS TR 19 (Castle class)
 HMCS TR 20 (Castle class)
 HMCS TR 21 (Castle class)
 HMCS TR 22 (Castle class)
 HMCS TR 23 (Castle class)
 HMCS TR 24 (Castle class)
 HMCS TR 25 (Castle class)
 HMCS TR 26 (Castle class)
 HMCS TR 27 (Castle class)
 HMCS TR 28 (Castle class)
 HMCS TR 29 (Castle class)
 HMCS TR 30 (Castle class)
 HMCS TR 31 (Castle class)
 HMCS TR 32 (Castle class)
 HMCS TR 33 (Castle class)
 HMCS TR 34 (Castle class)
 HMCS TR 35 (Castle class)
 HMCS TR 36 (Castle class)
 HMCS TR 37 (Castle class)
 HMCS TR 38 (Castle class)
 HMCS TR 39 (Castle class)
 HMCS TR 46 (Castle class)
 HMCS TR 47 (Castle class)
 HMCS TR 48 (Castle class)
 HMCS TR 49 (Castle class)
 HMCS TR 50 (Castle class)
 HMCS TR 51 (Castle class)
 HMCS TR 52 (Castle class)
 HMCS TR 53 (Castle class)
 HMCS TR 54 (Castle class)
 HMCS TR 55 (Castle class)
 HMCS TR 56 (Castle class)
 HMCS TR 57 (Castle class)
 HMCS TR 58 (Castle class)
 HMCS TR 59 (Castle class)
 HMCS TR 60 (Castle class)

Torpedo boats

 (ex-Tarantula)

Submarines


 (CC class)
 (H class)
 (H class)

Auxiliary vessels

Icebreakers

 CGS Earl Grey
 CGS Minto
 CGS Stanley

Training vessels

 HMCS Arthur W

Motor launches 

 Adelaide
 Alase
 Alva and May
 Amos B.
 Atlantic
 Fantom
 Foam (late Spray)
 Icthus M.
 Lilly
 Lillian
 Maude Mosher
 Meredith
 Mildred
 Mohawk
 Paragon
 Rambler
 Roanoke
 Roamer
 Rose
 Rover
 Ruth
 Shark
 Shamrock
 Swan
 Thistle
 Virginia

Patrol boats

 (2)
Albacore
 (later, depot ship)
Frank T. Coote
Atlanta (III)
 CGS Bayfield

 Deliverance

 Grib
 (ex-Winchester)

 HMCS Lansdowne

 (minelayer)

Survey vessels 

 Karluk
CGS Chrissie C. Thomey
 Gladiator
 CGS La Canadienne
 CGS Mary Sachs
 CGS North Star (III)

Tenders 

 Davy Jones
 Egret (I)
 Holly Leaf
 Ivy Leaf
 Laurel Leaf
 
 Tannis
 Valiant (I)
 Viking (ex-CGS Viking)
 Viner

Tugs 

 Alaska (II)
 C.E. Tanner
 Coastguard
 G.S. Mayes
 Gwennith
 Highland Mary (I)
 Ruth (II)
 Shark (ex-Nereid (II))
 Trusty
 M.W. Weatherspoon
 C. Wilfred

Other 

 CGS Alaska
 Berthier (examination vessel)
 Speedy (II) (examination vessel)
 HMCS Gate Vessel 3 (ex-W.H. Lee)
 HMCS Gopher (auxiliary minesweeper)
 HMCS Musquash (auxiliary minesweeper)
  (cruiser, third class)
 Falcon
 
  (depot ship)
 Ruth (I)
 Ruth (IV)
 Scotsman

See also
 Royal Canadian Navy
 Origins of the Royal Canadian Navy
 History of the Royal Canadian Navy
 List of ships of the Royal Canadian Navy
 Hull classification symbol (Canada)
 His Majesty's Canadian Ship
 List of aircraft of the Royal Canadian Navy
List of Royal Canadian Navy ships of the Second World War
List of Royal Canadian Navy ships of the Cold War

References

Bibliography and further reading

 
 
 
 
 
 
 
 
 
 
 

 

 01
 01
WW 01
Canada
.WW 01
Royal Canadian Navy ships WW 01
Ships WW 01